Where Chou (born 26 March 1977) is a Taiwanese singer, songwriter and actress. Chou released her debut album Where Chou Collection in 1999, which sold more than a million copies in Asia. Along with Stefanie Sun, Elva Hsiao and Jolin Tsai, Chou was regarded as one of the Four Upcoming Divas of Mandopop music in the late 1990s and early 2000s. She has released 7 studio albums to date.

Discography

Studio albums

EPs

Cover albums

Compilation albums

Filmography

Television series

Film

References

External links

 

1977 births
Living people
Musicians from Kaohsiung
20th-century Taiwanese actresses
20th-century Taiwanese singers
20th-century Taiwanese women singers
21st-century Taiwanese actresses
21st-century Taiwanese singers
21st-century Taiwanese women singers